is a type of Japanese pottery traditionally from the Amakusa islands, in Kumamoto Prefecture.

References

Culture in Kumamoto Prefecture
Japanese pottery